Milan is an Indian film art director. He is best known in the Tamil film industry for his films such as Billa (2007), Velayutham (2011) and Vedalam (2015).

Early life
Milan started his career as assistant to art director Sabu Cyril in 1999, and worked in films including Citizen, Thamizhan, Red, Villain and Anniyan.

Career
Milan has worked more than 30 films and 120 commercials such as Sakthi masala, Aachi masala, RMKV, Saravana Stores and Pothys.

Filmography

References

External links

Indian art directors
Living people
Year of birth missing (living people)